The 2006 XXXXI FIBA International Christmas Tournament "Trofeo Raimundo Saporta-Memorial Fernando Martín" was the 41st edition of the FIBA International Christmas Tournament. It took place at Palacio Vistalegre, Madrid, Spain, on 25 December 2006 with the participations of Real Madrid and Lietuvos rytas.

Final

December 25, 2006

|}

References

FIBA International Christmas Tournament
2005–06 in European basketball
2005–06 in Lithuanian basketball
2005–06 in Spanish basketball